Lewis Powell (1576–1636) was a Welsh politician who sat in the House of Commons between 1621 and 1625.

Powell was the son of Morgan Powell of Pembroke. He matriculated at Jesus College, Oxford on 23 October 1590 at the age of 14. He became a student of the Middle Temple in  1595. In 1621, he was elected Member of Parliament for Pembroke. He was unseated on petition on 18 May 1621, apparently owing to a double return. A new writ was ordered the same day and he was probably re-elected. In 1624 he was elected MP for  Haverfordwest. He was elected MP for Pembroke again in 1625.

References

 

 

1576 births
1636 deaths
Members of the Parliament of England (pre-1707) for constituencies in Wales
Alumni of Jesus College, Oxford
Members of the Middle Temple
People from Pembroke, Pembrokeshire
People from Haverfordwest
17th-century Welsh politicians
English MPs 1621–1622
English MPs 1624–1625
English MPs 1625